Two ships in the Confederate Navy were named CSS Nashville in honor of Nashville, Tennessee.

  was a steamer, seized in 1861. She was a blockade runner, renamed Thomas L. Wragg and later commissioned as the privateer Rattlesnake and destroyed in 1863
  was a large side-wheel steam ironclad built in 1863

See also